Anton Vladimirovich Sereda (born 18 January 1980) is a Russian former professional football player.

Club career
He played in the Russian Football National League for FC Metallurg Lipetsk in 2009.

References

External links
 

1980 births
People from Klintsy
Living people
Russian footballers
Association football midfielders
FC Metallurg Lipetsk players
FC Mordovia Saransk players
FC Rotor Volgograd players
FC Sheksna Cherepovets players
FC Torpedo NN Nizhny Novgorod players
Sportspeople from Bryansk Oblast